Mount O'Beirne is a mountain in the Continental Ranges on the border of Alberta and British Columbia. It is Alberta's 59th most prominent mountain. It was named in 1918 by Arthur Oliver Wheeler after Eugene Francis O'Beirne, a "sponger and general pest" who in 1864 had attached himself to William Wentworth-FitzWilliam, Viscount Milton and Walter Butler Cheadle's expedition over the Yellowhead Pass.

See also
 List of peaks on the British Columbia–Alberta border

References

Two-thousanders of Alberta
Two-thousanders of British Columbia
Canadian Rockies